The Sinos River Valley is situated northeast of the state of Rio Grande do Sul, Southern Brazil, covering two geomorphologic provinces: the Southern plateau and central depression, an area of almost 1398.5 km2, consisting of 14 municipalities. The Sinos River Basin consists of up to 32 municipalities.

Municipalities 
 Araricá
 Canoas
 Campo Bom
 Dois Irmãos
 Estância Velha
 Esteio
 Ivoti
 Nova Hartz
 Nova Santa Rita
 Novo Hamburgo 
 Portão
 São Leopoldo
 Sapiranga
 Sapucaia do Sul

See also
Vale do Sinos Technology Park, VALETEC Park

Valleys of Brazil
Landforms of Rio Grande do Sul